Markovo is a rural locality (a selo) in Nagornoye Rural Settlement, Petushinsky District, Vladimir Oblast, Russia. The population was 133 as of 2010. There are 9 streets.

Geography 
Markovo is located on the Verkhulka River, 29 km southwest of Petushki (the district's administrative centre) by road. Pokrov is the nearest rural locality.

References 

Rural localities in Petushinsky District